The Adelaide University Cricket Club is an amateur cricket club based in Adelaide, South Australia. It is an affiliate of the Adelaide University Sports Association and plays in the Premier League of the South Australian Cricket Association.  Although the club is associated with the University of Adelaide, players do not have to be students. Home matches are played at University Oval.

References

South Australian Grade Cricket clubs
Cricket Club
University and college sports clubs in Australia
Cricket clubs established in 1907
1907 establishments in Australia